Cruel Intention is Nasty Idols second album release after 1989's debut Gigolos on Parole. The album was re-released in 2002 as the band's original label (HSM) had gone bankrupt in 1994.

Track listing

Bonus tracks
"Sexshooter (Live Ver.)" -Only on the 2002 reissue-
"Electric Wonderland (Live Ver.)" -Only on the 2002 reissue-

Singles
"Alive N' Kickin' (1990)

Personnel
 Andy Pierce - Vocals
 Peter Espinoza - Lead Guitar
 Dick Qwarfort - Bass
 George Swanson - Drums
 Roger White - Keyboards

References

1991 albums
Nasty Idols albums